Into Temptation may refer to:

Into Temptation (film), the 2009 film written and directed by Patrick Coyle
"Into Temptation" (song), the 1988 song by rock group Crowded House